Pablo Abián Vicén (born 12 June 1985) is a Spanish badminton player. He was the men's singles gold medalists at the 2015 European Games, 2018 and 2022 Mediterranean Games.

Olympic Games

2008 (Beijing, China) 
He competed in badminton at the 2008 Summer Olympics in the men's singles and was defeated in the first round by Kęstutis Navickas (Lithuania), 23–21, 12–21, 21–9.

2012 (London, Great Britain) 
He competed in badminton at the 2012 Summer Olympics in the men's singles. He was the first Spanish man to win a match at an Olympic Games. He won in the first round against Petr Koukal (Czech Republic), 21–17, 16–21, 21–16, then he lost in the next match, against the 2004 Athens Olympics gold medalist Taufik Hidayat (Indonesia), 20–22, 11–21 after having a notable performance in first set where he earned a set point but putting a relatively easy smash into the net.

2016 (Rio de Janeiro, Brazil) 
He won his first match 21–12 and 21–10 against Jaspar Yu Woon Chai (Brunei) in the group stage, and lost his second encounter 18–21 and 19–21 to Hu Yun (Hong Kong) after having a good lead in both sets.

2020 (Tokyo, Japan) 
Abián competed in the men's singles event at the 2020 Summer Olympics.

World Championships

2006 (Madrid, Spain) 
Abián played at the 2006 IBF World Championships in the men's singles, and he was defeated in the first round by Andrew Smith of England, 21–15, 21–13.

2007 (Kuala Lumpur, Malaysia) 
The following year he competed at the 2007 BWF World Championships in the men's singles again. He beat Luka Petrič 21–9, 29–27 in the first round. In the second round, he was beaten by Simon Santoso of Indonesia 18–21, 15–21.

2010 (Paris, France) 
Abián competed at the 2010 BWF World Championships in the men's singles. In the first round, he won against Magnus Sahlberg of Sweden 21–15, 21–16, and was beaten in the second round by Marc Zwiebler of Germany with the score of 17–21, 18–21.

2011 (London, England) 
Abián played the 2011 BWF World Championships in the men's singles. In the first round, he beat Yuhan Tan 16–21, 21–17, 21–15. In the second round he won against Marc Zwiebler 21–17, 7–21, 24–22. In the last sixteen he lost against Kevin Cordón (Guatemala) 19–21, 21–19, 17–21.

2013 (Guangzhou, China) 
Abián played in the 2013 BWF World Championships in the men's singles. In the first round, he won against Osleni Guerrero (Cuba) by 21–14, 23–21. In the second round, he beat Ajay Jayaram (India) by 21–9, 21–17. In the last sixteen, he lost against Nguyễn Tiến Minh (Vietnam) 21–15, 9–21, 10–21.

European Championships 
In 2008, Abián was 5th in the European Championship (Herning, Denmark). In the first round he beat Atli Jóhannesson (Iceland) by 21–12, 21–8. In the second round he beath Aamir Ghaffar (England) by 22–20, 21–19. In the last sixteen he beat Steinar Klausen (Norway) 21–8, 21–9. In the quarter-finals he lost against Przemysław Wacha (Poland) 11–21, 17–21.

Abián played at the Master European Circuit Finals in 2010 (Netherlands), he lost in the final against Rune Ulsing (Denmark).

Abián finished first in the European Ranking in the season 2010/2011.

World University Championships, Universiade Games and Mediterranean Games 
Abián reached 5th place in the 2010 World University Championship (Chinese Taipei).

He achieved 5th place in the 2011 Summer Universiade (Shenzhen, China). He lost in the quarter-final against Wen Kai (China) by 12–21, 21–23.

Abián won the silver medal at the 2012 World University Championship (Gwangju, Korea). He lost the final against Wen Kai (China) by 16–21, 8–21.

He won the silver medal at the 2013 Mediterranean Games played in Mersin (Turkey).

Achievements

European Games 
Men's singles

Mediterranean Games 
Men's singles

Men's doubles

BWF Grand Prix (1 runner-up) 
The BWF Grand Prix had two levels, the Grand Prix and Grand Prix Gold. It was a series of badminton tournaments sanctioned by the Badminton World Federation (BWF) and played between 2007 and 2017.

Men's singles

  BWF Grand Prix Gold tournament
  BWF Grand Prix tournament

BWF International Challenge/Series (28 titles, 15 runners-up) 
Men's singles

  BWF International Challenge tournament
  BWF International Series tournament
  BWF Future Series tournament

Spanish National Championship

Notes

References

External links 
 
 
 
 
 
  
 Profile at Badminton Europe
 New World Championship 2013 at BE
 

1985 births
Living people
People from Calatayud
Sportspeople from the Province of Zaragoza
Spanish male badminton players
Badminton players at the 2008 Summer Olympics
Badminton players at the 2012 Summer Olympics
Badminton players at the 2016 Summer Olympics
Badminton players at the 2020 Summer Olympics
Olympic badminton players of Spain
Badminton players at the 2015 European Games
Badminton players at the 2019 European Games
European Games medalists in badminton
European Games gold medalists for Spain
Competitors at the 2013 Mediterranean Games
Competitors at the 2018 Mediterranean Games
Competitors at the 2022 Mediterranean Games
Mediterranean Games gold medalists for Spain
Mediterranean Games silver medalists for Spain
Mediterranean Games medalists in badminton